Jantz is a surname. Notable people with the surname include:

Barry Jantz (born 1959), American businessman and politician
Richard Jantz, American anthropologist

See also
Gantz (disambiguation)
Jantzen (disambiguation)

English-language surnames